David Addison Reese (March 3, 1794 – December 16, 1871) was an American politician and doctor.

Life 
Reese was born in Charlotte, North Carolina in 1794. He graduated from Jefferson Medical College in Philadelphia, Pennsylvania and began a medical practice in Elberton, Georgia. He later moved to Monticello, Georgia.

Elected to the Georgia Senate in 1829, Reese was re-elected to that office in 1830, 1834, 1835, and 1836. He also served as a trustee for the University of Georgia in Athens for 25 years.

Reese was elected to U.S. House of Representatives in 1852 as a member of the Whig party and served one term. After his congressional service, Reese resumed practicing medicine in Auburn, Alabama, died in that city in 1871 and was buried in Hopewell Cemetery in West Point, Georgia.

References

External links

 
 Reese Home historical marker

1794 births
1871 deaths
Politicians from Charlotte, North Carolina
American people of Welsh descent
Georgia (U.S. state) state senators
Physicians from Georgia (U.S. state)
University of Georgia people
Thomas Jefferson University alumni
People from Jasper County, Georgia
People from Auburn, Alabama
Whig Party members of the United States House of Representatives from Georgia (U.S. state)
19th-century American politicians
American slave owners